1990 Pirveli Liga was the 1st season of the Georgian Pirveli Liga. The Pirveli Liga is the second division of Georgian Football. It consists of reserve teams and professional teams.

League standings

See also
1990 Umaglesi Liga
1990 Georgian Cup

Erovnuli Liga 2 seasons
2
Georgia